Guillaume Gouffier-Cha (born 1 February 1986) is a French politician of La République En Marche! (LREM) who has been serving as a member of the French National Assembly since the 2017 elections, representing the department of Val-de-Marne.

Early career
In 2016, Gouffier-Cha joined the office of Defence Minister Jean-Yves Le Drian as advisor on relations with Parliament and elected officials.

Political career
Since entering parliament, Gouffier-Cha has been the treasurer of the LREM parliamentary group under the leadership of successive chairmen Richard Ferrand (2017-2018) and Gilles Le Gendre (since 2018). He also serves as member of the Committee on Legal Affairs. In this capacity, he has been serving as his parliamentary group's co-rapporteur on the government's pension reform plans since 2020, alongside Carole Grandjean, Jacques Maire and Corinne Vignon. Within his parliamentary group, he co-chairs (alongside Bérangère Couillard) a working group on fighting domestic violence.

In addition to his committee assignments, Gouffier-Cha is part of the French-Egyptian Parliamentary Friendship Group.

Political positions
In July 2019, Gouffier-Cha voted in favor of the French ratification of the European Union’s Comprehensive Economic and Trade Agreement (CETA) with Canada.

See also
 2017 French legislative election

References

1986 births
Living people
Deputies of the 15th National Assembly of the French Fifth Republic
La République En Marche! politicians
People from Beauvais
Politicians from Hauts-de-France